Neffsville is an unincorporated community in Manheim Township, Lancaster County, Pennsylvania, United States. Being unincorporated, Neffsville has no boundaries. The U.S. Geological Survey place names database locates Neffsville at 40°6'0"N 76°18'20"W. The retail and restaurant center of Neffsville is near 2500 Lititz Pike (Pennsylvania Route 501). Pennsylvania Route 722 leads west  to East Petersburg and east  to Pennsylvania Route 272 at Oregon.

Manheim Township High School on School Road is considered to be in Neffsville. The Manheim Township School District serves 5,400 students with 637 employees, 423 of them holding teaching certificates.

History
According to local tradition, Neffsville was named for the family of Johan Christian Neff, originally from Gerolsheim, Germany, who was aboard the ship Lydia when she arrived in Philadelphia on September 19, 1743. Neff moved to Lampeter Township in Lancaster County, married the former Frena Howery, and they had three children there - Christian in 1750, Henry in 1754, and Esther in 1757. All three married in Lancaster County, but Christian's life ended in Westmoreland County, Pennsylvania, and Esther's in Lebanon County, Pennsylvania. An elementary school on School Road was named for Henry Holt.

Shank's extracts

Jacob Shank, a Neffsville pharmacist, introduced "Shank's Compound Flavoring of Vanilla Bean" in 1899 to improve the taste of his medicines. The product is still made today, and Shank's is now the second-largest primary vanilla supplier in North America, as well as supplying other extracts, flavorings and spices. The Shanks family sold the business in 1959, and it is no longer in Neffsville, but many collectors prize their old extract bottles that read "Shank's Extracts - Neffsville, Pa."

Notable Neffsville residents 
 Jim Furyk, professional golfer
 Don Gehman, record producer
 Taylor Kinney, television actor, model
 Brad Rutter, second-winningest game show contestant in history

In popular culture
Neffsville appears in the animated movie Free Birds.

References

External links
Shank's Extracts

Unincorporated communities in Lancaster County, Pennsylvania
Unincorporated communities in Pennsylvania